The Citizens' Movement for Democracy and Development (MCD) is a political party in Togo.

History
The party was established on 2 February 2007, and received 0.6% of the vote in the parliamentary elections later that year, failing to win a seat. Prior to the 2013 parliamentary elections it joined the Rainbow Alliance, which went on to win six seats in the National Assembly.

References

External links
Official website

Political parties in Togo
2007 establishments in Togo
Political parties established in 2007